Sniper: Art of Victory is a 2008 tactical shooter video game developed and published by City Interactive for Microsoft Windows. Set during World War II, the player assumes the role of a sniper ally from the Red Army that takes part in operations in the Eastern Front and Italy. It is the first entry in the Sniper: Ghost Warrior series.

Gameplay
Sniper: Art of Victory consists of a series of missions in which the player must complete a number of objectives to complete them successfully. Before starting each mission, the player can read the orders in the loading screen, and in some parts of the game, some cutscenes are used to display mission objectives.

During the game, the map is a very important tool that shows the location of objectives, points of interest, sniper location points and also shows if enemy units are on alert.

Features
The game uses an advanced ballistic system that takes into account wind, bullet drop, and breathing. When a headshot is made, the camera follows the bullet on its way to the target.

Plot
Set during World War II, the player assumes the role of a sniper ally from the Red Army that takes part in operations in the Eastern Front and Italy.

Reception

Sniper: Art of Victory received "generally unfavourable" reviews according to review aggregator Metacritic.

References

External links
 

2008 video games
Single-player video games
Sniper: Ghost Warrior
Sniper video games
Tactical shooter video games
Video games about Nazi Germany
Video games developed in Poland
Video games set in the Soviet Union
World War II video games
Windows games
Windows-only games
CI Games games